Mesa Verde is a neighborhood in Costa Mesa, California. It is bounded by the Interstate 405 freeway to the north, Harbor Boulevard to the east, Victoria Street to the south, and the Santa Ana River to the west. The community is bisected by Adams Avenue and contains the Fairview Channel, a Santa Ana River tributary that connects to Fairview Park, a wetland and riparian natural area. The neighborhood is home to two golf course complexes–the Costa Mesa Golf Course and the Mesa Verde Country Club.

History
The area in which Mesa Verde is currently located was largely unconstructed until the 1960s and 1970s when an influx of developments hit the region.

The Mesa Verde Country Club opened in the northwest corner of the neighborhood in January of 1959 and has been home to numerous golfing events. The Orange County Opens and numerous PGA Tour events have been held at the course. The course was formerly home to the Toshiba Seniors Classic. Famous golfers such as Arnold Palmer, Tiger Woods, and Chi-Chi Rodríguez have golfed at the course.

Demographics

2010
The 2010 United States census reported that the population of the 92626 ZIP code was 49,341. The racial makeup of the area was 33,740 (68.4%) White, 964 (1.9%) African-American, 296 (0.6%) Native American, 6,433 (13.0%) Asian, 286 (0.6%) Hawaiian or Pacific Islander, 5,158 (10.5%) of other races, and 2,464 (5.0%) of two or more races.

2000
The 2000 United States census reported that the population of the 92626 ZIP code was 48,200. The racial makeup of the area was 34,672 (71.9%) White, 879 (1.8%) African-American, 273 (0.6%) Native American, 5,602 (11.6%) Asian, 386 (0.8%) Hawaiian or Pacific Islander, 4,311 (8.9%) of other races, and 2,077 (4.4%) of two or more races.

Amenities and facilities

Parks
 Estancia Park
 Fairview Park
 Mesa Verde Park
 Smallwood Park
 Tanager Park
 Moon Park

Cemeteries
 Harbor Lawn-Mt. Olive Memorial Park & Mortuary

Schools
 Early College High School
 Estancia High School
 TeWinkle Middle School
 California Elementary School
 Christ Lutheran School
 Renascence School International
 Wardolf School
 Wilson Elementary School

Congregations
 Christ Lutheran Church
 The Church of Jesus Christ of Latter-day Saints
 Family Christian Church
 Kingdom Hall of Jehovah's Witnesses
 Livingstone Chapel
 Mesa Verde United Methodist Church
 Orange Coast Unitarian Universalist Church
 Palm Harvest Church

Governmental services
Fairview Developmental Center, a California Department of Developmental Services campus, is situated in Mesa Verde adjacent to the Costa Mesa Golf Course. The 114-acre complex is owned by the State of California.

Mesa Verde has two fire stations. Royal Palm Fire Station, a recently built facility, services the northern half of Mesa Verde. Placentia Fire Station 4, located on Placentia Avenue, provides firefighting and EMT services for the southern portion of the neighborhood. The Costa Mesa Corporation Yard, a city-owned storage lot for governmental vehicles, is located behind the Placentia fire station.

The United States Postal Service operates a post office on Adams Avenue.

References

Costa Mesa, California
Orange County, California